Glorya Kaufman is an American philanthropist.

Early life
Glorya (Pinkis) Kaufman was born to a Jewish family in Detroit, Michigan during the Great Depression. Her father worked as a production manager for Automotive News and her mother volunteered for Jewish charities. Her parents could not afford dancing lessons for her.

Philanthropy

In 1994, Kaufman made a donation for the construction of the 10,040-square-foot Donald Bruce Kaufman branch of the Los Angeles Public Library in Brentwood, Los Angeles.

In 1999, Kaufman donated US$18 million to the University of California, Los Angeles, which named Glorya Kaufman Hall in her honor. However, she admitted to being disappointed in the way UCLA handled her donation.
 
In 2009, Kaufman donated US$20 million to the Los Angeles Music Center to establish the Glorya Kaufman Presents Dance series. She has also donated millions to the Alvin Ailey American Dance Theater and the Juilliard School in New York City. In 2011, she donated several millions to the University of Southern California for the establishment of the Glorya Kaufman School of Dance, which enrolled its first cohort of BFA majors in 2015, and the construction of the Glorya Kaufman International Dance Center. A year later, in 2012, she joined the board of trustees at USC.

Personal life
Kaufman is the widow of Donald Bruce Kaufman, who with Eli Broad co-founded Kaufman & Broad, now known as KB Home, in 1957. Broad's wife, Edythe Lawson, is Kaufman's first cousin. They had four children, Curtis, Gayl, Laura and Stacie Lyn. Donald and his son-in-law, Eyal Horwitz, both died in a plane crash in 1983; afterward Glorya turned to charity work. She raised her family in a sprawling Brentwood ranch house.

Kaufman currently resides in a US$18.2 million Italian-style villa in Beverly Hills, California with Erté tables and Louis Icart prints.

References

Living people
People from Beverly Hills, California
Jewish American philanthropists
University of California, Los Angeles people
University of Southern California people
20th-century births
Year of birth missing (living people)
21st-century American Jews